Werner Fischer (8 November 1940 – 6 June 2011) was an Austrian sailor. He competed at the 1964 Summer Olympics and the 1968 Summer Olympics.

References

External links
 

1940 births
2011 deaths
Austrian male sailors (sport)
Olympic sailors of Austria
Sailors at the 1964 Summer Olympics – Flying Dutchman
Sailors at the 1968 Summer Olympics – Flying Dutchman
People from Bregenz
Sportspeople from Vorarlberg